Crassula cultrata (Sharp-leaved Crassula) is a succulent plant native to the southern parts of South Africa (the Cape Provinces and KwaZulu-Natal).

Description

A small, erect, branching shrub (20-80 cm in height) with rounded, yellow-green leaves that have sharp, red-brown, cartilaginous margins. The leaf tip is typically rounded or obtuse. 

The succulent leaves are flattened, and ob-lanceolate or knife-shaped ("cultrata"). This shape, and the sharp, cartilaginous edges of its leaves, are distinctive.  

In December/January it produces elongated flower stems (12-40 cm), each with several loosely-held clumps of yellowish flowers (one of which is terminal). Each flower has black anthers and 3,5-4,5 mm long, cream coloured petals. The loose arrangement of the flowers is a key diagnostic character of this species.

Relatives 
This species is related to Crassula atropurpurea, Crassula subaphylla, Crassula cotyledonis, Crassula pubescens and Crassula nudicaulis. 
Crassula rogersii, another similar species that is also found in river valleys, is very much smaller, with leaves that are almost cylindrical. 

C.cultrata has flattened leaves, twisted to one side of the stem, with a sharp margin.

Distribution

It occurs from near Swellendam and Ladismith in the west, throughout the Little Karoo and Overberg regions, and across the arid parts of the Eastern Cape Province.

Its habitat is usually rocky ridges and outcrops in scrub vegetation, often in river valleys (like Crassula rogersii).

References

cultrata
Flora of the Cape Provinces
Plants described in 1753
Taxa named by Carl Linnaeus